Olivia Dillon (born 4 May 1973) is an Irish former racing cyclist. She competed in the 2012 UCI women's road race in Valkenburg aan de Geul and in the 2013 UCI women's road race in Florence.

Dillon won her national tour, Rás na mBan, on three occasions: 2010, 2011 and 2013. She is the only rider to win the event on more than one occasion.
Dillon won the Irish National Time Trial Championships on four occasions: 2008, 2009, 2010 and 2012 and she took victory in the Irish National Road Race Championships in 2010, one of five medals she won in the event.

Personal life
Dillon is married to American professional cyclist Tayler Wiles.

Major results

2008
 1st  Time trial, National Road Championships
2009
 National Road Championships
1st  Time trial
2nd Road race
2010
 National Road Championships
1st  Time trial
1st  Road race
 1st Overall Rás na mBan
1st Stages 1, 2 & 3 (ITT)
2011
 1st Overall Rás na mBan
1st Stages 2, 3 & 4
2012
 National Road Championships
1st  Time trial
3rd Road race
 2nd Overall Sea Otter Classic
 7th Overall Tour of the Gila
2013
 1st Overall Rás na mBan
1st Stage 3 (TTT)
 7th Overall Tour of Elk Grove
2014
 1st Stage 5 Rás na mBan
 2nd Road race, National Road Championships
 5th Overall Armed Forces Association Cycling Classic
 9th Overall Joe Martin Stage Race
 9th Overall North Star Grand Prix
2015
 3rd Road race, National Road Championships
 10th Overall Tulsa Tough

References

External links

1973 births
Living people
Irish female cyclists
Place of birth missing (living people)
LGBT cyclists